The Municipality of Piran is a municipality in the traditional region of the Littoral in southwestern Slovenia. The seat of the municipality is the town of Piran. Piran became a municipality in 1994.

Geography
The Municipality of Piran borders Croatia to the south and the municipalities of Izola and Koper to the east, and it faces Italy across the Gulf of Trieste and the Adriatic Sea.

Settlements

In addition to the municipal seat of Piran, the municipality also includes the following settlements:

 Dragonja
 Lucija
 Nova Vas nad Dragonjo
 Padna
 Parecag
 Portorož
 Seča
 Sečovlje
 Strunjan
 Sveti Peter

Language

The municipality is bilingual; both Slovene and Italian are official languages. According to the Austrian language census of 1910, in the surrounding countryside within the municipal limits, the population was mixed, both Italian and Slovene, with some villages (such as Sveti Peter and Padna) which were almost entirely Slovene, and others (such as Sečovlje and Seča) that were almost exclusively Italian-speaking. As a whole, 85.1% of the population of the Municipality of Piran were Italian speakers, and 15.2% were Slovenes.

References

External links

Municipality of Piran on Geopedia
Piran municipal site

 
Piran
1994 establishments in Slovenia